Chambers Corner or Chambers Corners is an unincorporated community located within Springfield Township in Burlington County, New Jersey, United States. The intersection defining the community is the junction of Monmouth Road (County Route 537) and U.S. Route 206. Juliustown Road (CR 669) runs to the south of the settlement and terminates at CR 537. Except for some stores and businesses that line US 206 and some single-family homes along CR 537, the area is mostly made up of farmland.

References

Springfield Township, Burlington County, New Jersey
Unincorporated communities in Burlington County, New Jersey
Unincorporated communities in New Jersey